Claudia Schüler (born 28 November 1987) is a Chilean field hockey player.

Schüler has represented Chile since her national debut in 2004.

Schüler made her junior debut at the 2005 Junior World Cup held in her home country, Chile, a year after her debut for the national senior team.

Schüler has been instrumental in Chile's successes at the  Pan American Cup. She has been given the goalkeeper of the tournament award at three consecutive editions of the tournament, in 2009, 2013 and 2017.

Following the 2017 Pan American Cup, Schüler was named goalkeeper of the 2017 Pan American Elite Team by the Pan American Hockey Federation. This is Schüler's third appearance as goalkeeper in the elite team, following 2009 and 2013.

References

1987 births
Living people
Chilean female field hockey players
South American Games silver medalists for Chile
South American Games bronze medalists for Chile
South American Games medalists in field hockey
Competitors at the 2014 South American Games
Competitors at the 2018 South American Games
Pan American Games bronze medalists for Chile
Pan American Games medalists in field hockey
Field hockey players at the 2011 Pan American Games
Field hockey players at the 2019 Pan American Games
Medalists at the 2011 Pan American Games
20th-century Chilean women
21st-century Chilean women